Beatles for Sale is an EP released 6 April 1965 by the Beatles. It is the group's eighth official EP and contains four tracks from the parent LP of the same name. The EP is only available in mono. Its catalogue number is Parlophone GEP 8931. It was also released in  Australia and India.

Beatles for Sale''' entered the EP chart on 10 April and reached the top spot on 24 April. It remained there for five weeks, and spent another week at number one from 12 June.

As with previous releases, it features sleeve notes by the group's publicist, Tony Barrow. The parent LP (also called Beatles for Sale) was issued in December 1964. In the weeks before Christmas copies passed over the disc-store counters at such a remarkable rate that Beatles for Sale'' became one of the world's fastest-selling albums.

Track listing
All songs written by Lennon-McCartney apart from “Rock and Roll Music” written by Chuck Berry.
Side A
"No Reply" – 2:15
"I'm a Loser" – 2:30

Side B
"Rock and Roll Music" – 2:32
"Eight Days a Week" – 2:43

Personnel
John Lennon – vocals, guitars, harmonica on 'I'm a Loser'
Paul McCartney – bass guitar, vocals
George Harrison – guitars
Ringo Starr – drums, percussion

References

1965 EPs
Albums produced by George Martin
The Beatles EPs
Parlophone EPs